Miah Grace Madden is an Australian actress and presenter. She began her career as a child actress in the film The Sapphires (2012) and the ABC series The Gods of Wheat Street (2014). She has since starred in the ABC Me series The Unlisted (2019) and the 10 Shake series Dive Club (2021).

Early life and education 
Miah Grace Madden is from Rose Bay, a suburb east of Sydney. She is the daughter of Lee Madden, who was a Gadigal man with some Bundjalung heritage, and Belinda Kirkpatrick. Her father died in a car accident in 2003 when Miah was two and her mother was pregnant with her sister Ruby. She is the younger half-sister of Madeleine Madden.

She attended St Catherine's School, Waverley.

Career
Madden began her career playing a younger version of Jessica Mauboy's character in the 2012 film The Sapphires. She reprised a young Mauboy again in her "Never Be the Same" music video. She landed her first major television role as Athena Freeburn in the ABC TV drama The Gods of Wheat Street.

Madden played April Tucker in the 2017 film Australia Day. She appeared in the 2018 NITV series Little J & Big Cuz.

In 2019 and 2020, Madden starred in two children's science fiction series: the ABC Me series The Unlisted as Kymara and the 9Go! series The Gamers 2037 as Kite. She hosted the third season of the Nickelodeon Australia series Crash the Bash and had a recurring role in the ABC Me comedy-drama Mustangs FC.

As of 2021, Madden stars as Maddie in the 10 Shake teen series Dive Club and has joined the cast of the Nickelodeon fantasy The Bureau of Magical Things as Tayla Devlin for its second season.

Filmography

Film

Television

Music videos
 "Never Be the Same" (2014), Jessica Mauboy

References

External links

2001 births
Living people
21st-century Australian actresses
Actresses from Sydney
Australian child actresses
Indigenous Australian actresses
People from the Eastern Suburbs (Sydney)